For the 2007–08 season, Carlisle United F.C. competed in Football League One.

Results & fixtures

English League One

Football League play-offs

English League Cup

FA Cup

Football League Trophy

References
 11v11

Carlisle United F.C. seasons
Carlisle United